Maiken Fruergaard Sørensen (born 11 May 1995) is a Danish badminton player, specializing in doubles play. As a junior player, she was the gold medalists at the 2013 European Junior Championships in the team and mixed doubles events, and in 2014, she entered the national team.

Career 
Fruergaard competed at the 2020 Tokyo Olympics partnering Sara Thygesen. Her pace at the Games was stopped in the group stage after placing 4th in the group C standings.

Achievements

European Championships 
Women's doubles

European Junior Championships 
Mixed doubles

BWF World Tour (1 runner-up) 
The BWF World Tour, which was announced on 19 March 2017 and implemented in 2018, is a series of elite badminton tournaments sanctioned by the Badminton World Federation (BWF). The BWF World Tour is divided into levels of World Tour Finals, Super 1000, Super 750, Super 500, Super 300 (part of the HSBC World Tour), and the BWF Tour Super 100.

Women's doubles

BWF Grand Prix (1 runner-up) 
The BWF Grand Prix had two levels, the Grand Prix and Grand Prix Gold. It was a series of badminton tournaments sanctioned by the Badminton World Federation (BWF) and played between 2007 and 2017.

Mixed doubles

  BWF Grand Prix Gold tournament
  BWF Grand Prix tournament

BWF International Challenge/Series (3 titles, 3 runners-up) 
Women's doubles

Mixed doubles

  BWF International Challenge tournament
  BWF International Series tournament
  BWF Future Series tournament

References

External links 
 
 Maiken Fruergaard's Homepage

1995 births
Living people
Sportspeople from Odense
Danish female badminton players
Badminton players at the 2020 Summer Olympics
Olympic badminton players of Denmark
Badminton players at the 2019 European Games
European Games competitors for Denmark
21st-century Danish women